Held In Trust is a lost 1920 American silent romance film directed by John Ince and produced and distributed by Metro Pictures. The film stars May Allison.

Plot
As described in a film magazine, struck by her resemblance to Adelaide Rutherford, dissolute husband Hasbrouck Rutherford (Long) and attorney Jasper Haig (Elliott) inveigle shop girl Mary Manchester (Allison) into impersonating the wealthy woman. Hasbrouck and Jasper have been misusing the funds of the wife and her pending death threatens their exposure. Because Adelaide's husband's evil dissipations have driven her insane and separated them, the conspirators believe the duplicity can be easily effected and the funds and knowledge of her death kept from her heir, her nephew Stanford Gorgas (Foss). An associate of Stanford convinces him that there is something mysterious about the situation, and he proceeds to investigate. He visits Mary in the Rutherford home, and she learns that he is the heir. Appealing to him, he rescues her from the hands of the plotters, only to have the conspirators' carefully laid scheme bring Mary back into their hands. An attempt by Hasbrouck to force his attentions on Mary results in the death of attorney Jasper and his own insanity, leaving the funds to the lovers and allowing them to live in peace.

Cast
May Allison as Mary Manchester
Darrell Foss as Stanford Gorgas
Walter Long as Hasbrouck Rutherford
John Elliott as Jasper Haig (credited as John H. Elliott)
Lawrence Grant as Dr. Babcock
G. Burnell Manly as Dr. David Kirkland
Teddy Whack as Dog

References

External links

Glass slide

1920 films
American silent feature films
Lost American films
Metro Pictures films
1920s romance films
American black-and-white films
1920 lost films
Lost romance films
1920s American films